The 2021 Phillips 66 Big 12 men's basketball tournament was a postseason men's basketball tournament for the Big 12 Conference. It was played from March 10 to 13, in Kansas City, Missouri at the T-Mobile Center. The winner received the conference's automatic bid to the 2021 NCAA tournament. Texas defeated Oklahoma State in the championship to earn their first Big 12 Tournament Championship and third Conference tournament Championship overall.  Texas became the first school that was not a member of the Big Eight Conference to win the tournament.

Seeds
All ten teams participated in the tournament. The top six teams earned a first-round bye. 
	
Teams were seeded by record within the conference, with a tiebreaker system to seed teams with identical conference records. What tiebreakers were used for each tie is included in the table.

Schedule
All games had limited attendance due to the COVID-19 pandemic.

Bracket

Notes

References

2020–21 Big 12 Conference men's basketball season
Big 12 men's basketball tournament
Basketball competitions in Kansas City, Missouri
College sports tournaments in Missouri
2021 in sports in Missouri